The Treaty of Moscow was signed on 12 August 1970 between the Soviet Union and West Germany. It was signed by Willy Brandt and Walter Scheel for West Germany's side and by Alexei Kosygin and Andrei Gromyko for the Soviet Union.

Description
In the 1970s, West German Chancellor Willy Brandt's Ostpolitik was a policy that "abandoned, at least for the time being, its claims with respect to German self-determination and reunification, recognising de facto the existence of the German Democratic Republic (GDR) and the Oder–Neisse line".  

Both sides expressed their ambition to strive for a normalisation of the relations between the European states while they kept international peace and to follow the guidelines of the Article 2 of the UN Charter.

The signees renounced the use of force and recognised the postwar borders, specifically, the Oder–Neisse line, which hived off a large portion of historical eastern Germany to Poland and the Soviet Union.

It also enshrined the division between East Germany and West Germany, thus contributing a valuable element of stability into the relationship between the two countries.

See also
 Treaty of Moscow (disambiguation), for other treaties known by this name
Treaty of Warsaw from December 7, 1970
Four Power Agreement on Berlin from September 3, 1971
Basic Treaty from December 21, 1972

References
 Wording of the Treaty Of Moscow.
 Texts of FRG Treaties with Socialist Countries in 1970–1973.
 The Moscow Treaty (12 August 1970) (in English) retrieved from the CVCE website. Source: United States-Department of State. Documents on Germany 1944–1985. Washington: Department of State, [s.d.], pp. 1103–5.
 Europe: The End of World War II August 17, 1970 Time.

Further reading
 Notes of reply from the three Western Powers (11 August 1970) retrieved from the CVCE website.
Pierre, Andrew J.  The Bonn-Moscow Treaty of 1970: Milestone or Mirage? Russian Review, Vol. 30, No. 1 (Jan., 1971), pp. 17–26
 Фалин В. М. Без скидок на обстоятельства: Политические воспоминания. — М.: Республика: Современник, 1999. — 463 с.: ил.

Footnotes

Moscow Treaty, 1970
Moscow 1970
1970 in the Soviet Union
Germany–Soviet Union relations
Treaties concluded in 1970
Boundary treaties
Moscow 1970
Willy Brandt
1970 in Moscow